Amin Hafeez is a Lahore-based independent journalist, news reporter and YouTuber, known for his unique and funny reporting style. He received the Pride of Performance award by the President of Pakistan in 2018 for journalism.

Career 
Hafeez started his career in journalism in 1986. His electronic media career began in 2002 with GEO TV. Throughout his career, he has been known for his unique and funny news reports. In 2018, his news report of discussing age-old relations between humans and donkeys, while riding a donkey, went viral. His interview with a buffalo also went viral in 2021.

He left Jang Media Group in February 2022, to focus on his YouTube career. His YouTube channel has 154K subscribers.

Award(s) 
 Pride of Performance Award 2018 by the President of Pakistan

See also 
 Chand Nawab

References

External links 
Amin Hafeez interview by UrduPoint

Living people
Pakistani reporters and correspondents
Year of birth missing (living people)
Recipients of the Pride of Performance
People from Lahore